Bishop Nikolaus Messmer, S.J. (19 December 1954 − 18 July 2016) was a Roman Catholic prelate who served as the titular bishop of Carmeiano and the first Apostolic Administrator of the Apostolic Administration of Kyrgyzstan from 2006 until his death in 2016.

History

Bishop Messmer was born in Karaganda, Kazakh SSR in a family of German descent. At a young age he joined the Society of Jesus and was ordained as priest on 28 May 1989 and he was sent to serve in Kyrgyzstan.  He was appointed Apostolic Administrator of the new elevated Apostolic Administration of Kyrgyzstan by Pope Benedict XVI on 18 March 2006.

Death

Messmer died on 18 July 2016 in Bishkek at the age of 61.

References 

1954 births
2016 deaths
21st-century Roman Catholic titular bishops
People from Karaganda
Jesuit bishops
Kyrgyzstani people of German descent
Catholic Church in Kyrgyzstan